The Omeo Highway is a 163 kilometre road in eastern Victoria, Australia, connecting north-east Victoria to Gippsland over parts of the Victorian Alps.

There are no substantial settlements between Mitta Mitta and Omeo, and therefore fuel is unavailable. There is no mobile phone communication from Mitta Mitta to south of Anglers' rest although there is an emergency roadside phone at the base of Mt Wills. There is some CB repeater coverage including Ch1 (Mitta). Monitor other traffic and log trucks on Ch 40.

Police and ambulance services are available at Mitta Mitta and Omeo.

Conditions in the mountains can change quickly and be harsh, particularly during winter. Snow is not uncommon in the winter season and may cause the road to be closed for short periods.

As probably one of the most impressive scenic routes in Australia, there are excellent views along most of the road, making it very popular with tourists.  Due to winding nature of the road along the Omeo Highway, it is a common place for large groups of motorcycles to go riding. The Victorian Government completed the sealing of the road in March 2014 and the official opening of the completed highway took place at "The Walnuts" in May 2014.

There are some interesting stories of the highway that can be downloaded.

History
The passing of the Highways and Vehicles Act of 1924 through the Parliament of Victoria provided for the declaration of State Highways, roads two-thirds financed by the State government through the Country Roads Board (later VicRoads). The Omeo Highway was declared a State Highway on 11 February 1925 - Victoria's first gazetted State Highway - cobbled from a collection of roads from Bairnsdale through Bruthen, Omeo, and Tallangatta to Wodonga; before this declaration, the road between Bairnsdale and Tallangatta was referred to as Bairnsdale-Bruthen Road, Bruthen-Omeo Road or simply Omeo Road; the Omeo Highway was later reclassified to terminate in Tallangatta when the Murray Valley Highway (with a section running between Wodonga and Tallangatta) was declared a few years later in 1932.

The Omeo Highway was signed as State Route 195 between Tallangatta and Bairnsdale in 1986. The alignment between Omeo and Bairnsdale was subsumed into the Great Alpine Road with its declaration in 1998: the present-day Omeo Highway runs a truncated route between Tallangatta and Omeo. With Victoria's conversion to the newer alphanumeric system in the late 1990s, the remainder of the highway was assigned route C543.

Major intersections

See also 

 Highways in Australia
 Highways in Victoria

References

External links

Highways in Victoria (Australia)